The 2023 Navarrese regional election will be held on Sunday, 28 May 2023, to elect the 11th Parliament of the Chartered Community of Navarre. All 50 seats in the Parliament will be up for election. The election will be held simultaneously with regional elections in eleven other autonomous communities and local elections all throughout Spain.

Overview

Electoral system
The Parliament of Navarre is the devolved, unicameral legislature of the Chartered Community of Navarre, having legislative power in regional matters as defined by the Spanish Constitution and the Reintegration and Enhancement of the Foral Regime of Navarre Law, as well as the ability to vote confidence in or withdraw it from a regional president.

Voting is on the basis of universal suffrage, which comprises all nationals over 18 years of age, registered in Navarre and in full enjoyment of their political rights. The "begged" or expat vote system, requiring Navarrese people abroad to apply for voting before being permitted to vote, was repealed in 2022. The 50 members of the Parliament of Navarre are elected using the D'Hondt method and a closed list proportional representation, with a threshold of three percent of valid votes—which includes blank ballots—being applied regionally. Parties not reaching the threshold are not taken into consideration for seat distribution.

Election date
The term of the Parliament of Navarre expires four years after the date of its previous election, unless it is dissolved earlier. The election decree shall be issued no later than the twenty-fifth day prior to the date of expiry of parliament and published on the following day in the Official Gazette of Navarre (BON), with election day taking place on the fifty-fourth day from publication. The previous election was held on 26 May 2019, which means that the legislature's term will expire on 26 May 2023. The election decree must be published in the BON no later than 2 May 2023, with the election taking place on the fifty-fourth day from publication, setting the latest possible election date for the Parliament on Sunday, 25 June 2023.

The president has the prerogative to dissolve the Parliament of Navarre and call a snap election, provided that no motion of no confidence is in process, no nationwide election is due and some time requirements are met: namely, that dissolution does not occur either during the first legislative session or within the legislature's last year ahead of its scheduled expiry, nor before one year has elapsed since a previous dissolution under this procedure. In the event of an investiture process failing to elect a regional president within a three-month period from the election date, the Parliament shall be automatically dissolved and a fresh election called.

Parliamentary composition

The table below shows the composition of the parliamentary groups in the Parliament at the present time.

Parties and candidates
The electoral law allows for parties and federations registered in the interior ministry, coalitions and groupings of electors to present lists of candidates. Parties and federations intending to form a coalition ahead of an election are required to inform the relevant Electoral Commission within ten days of the election call, whereas groupings of electors need to secure the signature of at least one percent of the electorate in Navarre, disallowing electors from signing for more than one list of candidates.

Below is a list of the main parties and electoral alliances which will likely contest the election:

There was debate on whether the Navarra Suma (NA+) alliance between the Navarrese People's Union (UPN), Citizens–Party of the Citizenry (Cs) and the People's Party (PP) would be renewed ahead of the 2023 election, with some members within UPN advocating for their party to run under their own label instead while at most allowing some members from PP and Cs to be incorporated as independents within their lists.

UPN suffered a split following a troubling vote in the Congress of Deputies on the issue of labour reform on 3 February 2022, when deputies Sergio Sayas and Carlos García Adanero broke party discipline and voted against the reform proposed by Pedro Sánchez's government, almost succeeding in bringing it down despite the UPN leadership having pledged its support to the law. As a result, both Sayas and Adanero had their party membership suspended, who then pledged to run on their own under a brand new platform. This was materialized during an event held on 14 June 2022, when the platform—provisionally dubbed as "Navarre Platform"—was publicly announced, with the support of former high-ranking UPN officers such as former regional Development minister Luis Zarraluqui or former mayor of Estella Begoña Ganuza, among others. By the end of 2022, this platform had entered talks with the PP to evaluate the prospects of fielding a joint list to the regional election.

Opinion polls
The tables below list opinion polling results in reverse chronological order, showing the most recent first and using the dates when the survey fieldwork was done, as opposed to the date of publication. Where the fieldwork dates are unknown, the date of publication is given instead. The highest percentage figure in each polling survey is displayed with its background shaded in the leading party's colour. If a tie ensues, this is applied to the figures with the highest percentages. The "Lead" column on the right shows the percentage-point difference between the parties with the highest percentages in a poll.

Graphical summary

Voting intention estimates
The table below lists weighted voting intention estimates. Refusals are generally excluded from the party vote percentages, while question wording and the treatment of "don't know" responses and those not intending to vote may vary between polling organisations. When available, seat projections determined by the polling organisations are displayed below (or in place of) the percentages in a smaller font; 26 seats are required for an absolute majority in the Parliament of Navarre.

Voting preferences
The table below lists raw, unweighted voting preferences.

Victory preferences
The table below lists opinion polling on the victory preferences for each party in the event of a regional election taking place.

Victory likelihood
The table below lists opinion polling on the perceived likelihood of victory for each party in the event of a general election taking place.

Results

Notes

References
Opinion poll sources

Other

Navarre
Navarre
2020s